RNDP may stand for
 National Rally for Development and Progress, a political party in Chad
 Rakhine Nationalities Development Party, a political party in Myanmar
 Radon Decay Product, a short-lived radioisotopes Po-218, Pb-214, Bi-214 and Po-214